USS Missoula may refer to the following ships of the United States Navy:

, was the Montana renamed in 1915
, was a transport in service from 1943 to 1968

United States Navy ship names